The Wagon Show is a 1928 American silent Western film directed by Harry Joe Brown and written by Ford Beebe and Don Ryan. The film stars Ken Maynard, Ena Gregory, Maurice Costello, Fred Malatesta, George Davis and May Boley. The film was released on February 19, 1928, by First National Pictures.

Cast    
 Ken Maynard as Bob Mason
 Ena Gregory as Sally Beldan
 Maurice Costello as Colonel Beldan
 Fred Malatesta as Vicarino
 George Davis as Hank
 May Boley as The Strong Woman
 Paul Weigel as Joey
 Henry Roquemore as The Barker
 Sydney Jarvis as Sayre 
 Tarzan as Tarzan

References

External links
 

1928 films
1928 Western (genre) films
First National Pictures films
Films directed by Harry Joe Brown
American black-and-white films
Silent American Western (genre) films
1920s English-language films
1920s American films